Rosemary Anne Leach (18 December 1935 – 21 October 2017) was a British stage, television and film actress. She won the 1982 Olivier Award for Best Actress in a New Play for 84, Charing Cross Road and was nominated for the BAFTA Award for Best Actress in a Supporting Role for her roles in the films That'll Be the Day (1973) and A Room with a View (1985).

She appeared in several TV mini-series, including Germinal (1970), The Jewel in the Crown (1984), The Charmer (1987), The Buccaneers (1995) and Berkeley Square (1998), and had a recurring role on the sitcom My Family (2003–2007).

Early life 
Leach was born at Much Wenlock, Shropshire. Her parents were teachers, related to the social anthropologist Edmund Leach; she attended grammar school and RADA. After appearing in repertory theatres and the Old Vic she became well known to UK TV viewers between 1965 and 1969 for playing Susan Wheldon, the mistress of building tycoon John Wilder (Patrick Wymark) in the TV boardroom drama The Power Game.

Career 

In 1970 she played the part of Marcelle in the BBC's The Roads to Freedom, their adaptation of the trilogy of novels with the same name by Jean-Paul Sartre.

In 1971 she appeared as Laurie Lee'''s mother in a BBC adaptation of Cider with Rosie.

In 1973, she played Aldonza/Dulcinea in the BBC production of Don Quixote (retitled The Adventures of Don Quixote), starring Rex Harrison and Frank Finlay. In 1978, she played Queen Victoria in the four-part TV edition of  Disraeli. In 1981, she played Emilia opposite Bob Hoskins's Iago in the BBC Shakespeare production of Othello.

In 1982, she played Aunt Fenny in The Jewel in the Crown and 1986 in a Jack Rosenthal British television Christmas play Day To Remember. She played a leading role as smitten Joan Plumleigh-Bruce in the six-part ITV 1987 production of The Charmer which starred Nigel Havers.

Her film roles included David Essex's mother in That'll Be the Day (1973), Ghost in the Noonday Sun (1973), the TV remake of Brief Encounter (1974), S.O.S. Titanic (1979), and a voice role in the animated film of The Plague Dogs (1982).

In 1987, she was nominated for BAFTA's Best Supporting Actress for A Room with a View (1985). In 1992, Leach starred in An Ungentlemanly Act, a BBC television film about the first days of the invasion of the Falkland Islands in 1982, portraying the real-life Lady Mavis Hunt, wife of the islands' then governor, Sir Rex Hunt. In 1995, Leach participated in the popular BBC miniseries The Buccaneers a five-part television adaptation of Edith Wharton's unfinished novel. Leach appeared as Selina Marable, Marchioness of Brightlingsea.

Leach played the part of Anna in BBC Radio 4's No Commitments, and Susan Harper's mother Grace in My Family. She made a guest appearance as 'Bessie' on Waterloo Road (the TV series), in Series 3 Spring Term. From 1994, she made occasional appearances in The Archers as Ellen Rogers, the ex-pat aunt of Nigel Pargetter. She portrayed Miss Twitterton in the Radio 4 adaptation of the Lord Peter Wimsey story Busman's Honeymoon, first broadcast in 1983.

In 2001, she played a leading role in Destroying Angel, an episode of Midsomer Murders. She played Queen Elizabeth II three times: in the 2002 television movie Prince William; in a 2006 updated edition of The Afternoon Play entitled Tea with Betty; and in 2009's Margaret. She played "Miss Plum" in an episode of Heartbeat called "Every dog his day" in 2004.

 Death 
Leach died at Charing Cross Hospital, in London, aged 81, in 2017 following a short illness.

 Filmography 
 Film 

 Television 

 Radio plays 
 Shirley Gee: Moonshine (1977)
 Penny in "Love's Executioner" in the series True Encounters'' with Henry Goodman and Ben Daniels directed by John Taylor, a Fiction Factory production for BBC Radio 4. (1996)

Awards and nominations

References

External links 
 
 Rosemary Leach profile, Aveleyman.com

1935 births
Alumni of RADA
2017 deaths
British film actresses
British television actresses
British soap opera actresses
British radio actresses
People from Much Wenlock
Laurence Olivier Award winners
Audiobook narrators